Didugu is a village in Palnadu district of the Indian state of Andhra Pradesh. It is located in Amaravathi mandal of Guntur revenue division. The village forms a part of Andhra Pradesh Capital Region, under the jurisdiction of APCRDA.

Geography 

Demographics 

 Census of India, Didugu had a population of 3,152. The total population constitute, 1,580 males and 1,572 females with a sex ratio of 995 females per 1000 males. 336 children are in the age group of 0–6 years, with child sex ratio of 846 girls per 1000 boys. The average literacy rate stands at 53.69% with 1789 literates.

Government and politics 

Didugu Gram Panchayat is the local self-government of the village. There are wards, each represented by an elected ward member. The present sarpanch is vacant, elected by the ward members. The village is administered by the  Amaravathi Mandal Parishad at the intermediate level of panchayat raj institutions.

Education 

As per the school information report for the academic year 2018–19, the village has a total of 2 schools. These schools include one MPP and one private school.

References 

Villages in Palnadu district